The letter and spirit of the law is an idiomatic antithesis.

Letter of the law may also refer to:
"The Letter of the Law", 1936 short story by P. G. Wodehouse
Takeru: Letter of the Law, 1996 manga series by Buichi Terasawa

See also
Black letter law